Thérèse Brenet (born 22 October 1935) is a French composer.

Born in Paris, she studied at the Conservatoire de Reims and since 1954 the Conservatoire de Paris. Among her teachers were Maurice Duruflé, Henri Dutilleux, Darius Milhaud, and Jean Rivier. In 1965 she won the Prix de Rome for her Les Visions prophétiques de Cassandre; a prize which enabled her to pursue further studies at the French Academy in Rome. She went on to win the Halphen Prize for fugue and composition and won the Coplay Foundation of Chicago's composition prize. She is also an honorary member of the National Academy of History in Reims.

References

External links
Official Website of Thérèse Brenet (archive from 8 June 2009; accessed 29 October 2018).
 Thérèse Brenet's biography  on Cdmc’s website

1935 births
20th-century classical composers
Academic staff of the Conservatoire de Paris
Conservatoire de Paris alumni
French women composers
French classical composers
Living people
Prix de Rome for composition
Pupils of Darius Milhaud